John Thomas Andrews (born 1937) is a British-American geologist and professor emeritus of geological and atmospheric and oceanic sciences at the University of Colorado Boulder's Institute of Arctic and Alpine Research (INSTAAR), in Boulder, Colorado, USA.

Andrews was awarded his BA in geosciences in 1959 from the University of Nottingham in England, a MS in geology from McGill University in Montreal, Quebec, Canada, in 1961, a PhD from Nottingham in 1965, and a DSc from there in 1978.

He was the 1973 winner of the Geological Society of America's Quaternary Geology and Geomorphology Division's Kirk Bryan Award. Andrew was named a fellow of the American Geophysical Union in 2006. In 2011, Andrews was elected a Fellow of the American Association for the Advancement of Science.  He is the 2016 Geological Society of America's Penrose Medal winner for his contribution to advancing the understanding of how partial collapses of the Laurentide Ice Sheet are reflected in Heinrich events and have contributed to abrupt climate change during the Quaternary, his area of expertise.

References

External links
 Curriculum vitae

University of Colorado Boulder faculty
Fellows of the American Association for the Advancement of Science
American geologists
University of North Dakota faculty
Living people
Penrose Medal winners
1937 births
Fellows of the American Geophysical Union